Valeriano Martínez (1961 – 6 October 2021) was a Spanish politician. A member of the People's Party of Galicia, he served as Minister of Finance of Galicia from 2015 until 2021 and was a member of the Parliament of Galicia from 2016 to 2017.

Martínez died on 6 October 2021, at his office as a result of suffering a cardiac arrest.

References

1961 births
2021 deaths
21st-century Spanish politicians
People's Party (Spain) politicians
Members of the 10th Parliament of Galicia
People from Cangas, Pontevedra